This is a list of scores of 400 or more runs made by a team in a One Day International (ODI), a form of one-day cricket played between international cricket teams who are Full Members of the International Cricket Council (ICC) as well as the top six Associate and Affiliate members. Unlike Test matches, ODIs consist of one innings per team, with a limit on the number of overs. The limit is currently 50 overs per innings, although in the past this has varied. The earliest match now recognised as an ODI was played between England and Australia on 5 January 1971; since then there have been over 4,000 ODIs played between 26 teams.

Team totals have risen steadily throughout the history of ODIs. This has accelerated in recent years, with improvements in techniques, new playing methods and introduction of Twenty20 International cricket. The highest team total before 400 runs was reached was the 398/5 scored by Sri Lanka against Kenya on 6 March 1996 at Asgiriya Stadium, Kandy.

The 400 marks were first broken during a notable match between South Africa and Australia, with both teams passing 400 runs in their respective innings. As batting powerplays and other fielding restrictions have come into play, 400+ totals have become more common. Six international teams have scored 400+ totals in their matches. South Africa and India have recorded more 400+ scores in ODIs than any other nation, with six such scores as of December 2022. Both teams have scored 400+ runs twice in the ODI format, with the first one being the Australia vs South Africa match in 2006 and the second occurrence being India vs Sri Lanka in 2009.

As of December 2022, there have been 22 occasions where a team has recorded a 400+ total.

The highest score is ODI was achieved by England, who scored 498/4 in 50 overs against Netherlands at VRA Cricket ground on 17 June 2022.

Listing notation
Team notation
 (300/3) indicates that a team scored 300 runs for three wickets and the innings was closed, either due to a successful run chase or if no overs remained (or are able) to be bowled.
 (300) indicates that a team scored 300 runs and was all out, either by losing all ten wickets or by having one or more batsmen unable to bat and losing the remaining wickets.

Batting notation
 (100*) indicates that a batsman scored 100 runs and was not out.
 (175) indicates that a batsman scored 175 runs and was out after that.

Bowling notation
 (5/40) indicates that a bowler has captured 5 wickets while giving away 40 runs.
 (49.5 overs) indicates that a team bowled 49 complete overs (each of six legal deliveries), and one incomplete over of just five deliveries.

List in chronological order

By teams

Match summary of the 400+ totals

1st & 2nd 400+ scores

3rd 400+ score

4th 400+ score

5th 400+ score

6th 400+ score

7th & 8th 400+ scores

9th 400+ score

10th 400+ score

11th 400+ score

12th 400+ score

13th 400+ score

14th 400+ score

15th 400+ score

16th 400+ score

17th 400+ score

18th 400+ score

19th 400+ score

20th 400+ score

21st 400+ score

22nd 400+ score

References

 One Day International cricket records
Cricket-related lists
 Cricket records and statistics